The Scharnhorst Memorial on Unter den Linden avenue in Berlin's Mitte district commemorates the Prussian military reformer and freedom fighter Gerhard von Scharnhorst (1755–1813). Created from 1819 to 1822 by Christian Daniel Rauch in neoclassical style, it is a masterpiece of the Berlin school of sculpture.

Until 1951 the memorial stood to the right of the Neue Wache, with which it formed an urban ensemble, and since 1963 it has stood opposite it. The marble statue was removed in 2021 due to weathering and will be replaced by a replica. In this context the re-erection at the original location is being discussed.

Gallery

See also 
 Bülow Memorial, Berlin

References

Further reading

External links 

 Scharnhorst Memorial – Berlin Monument Authority (in German)

Monuments and memorials in Berlin
Outdoor sculptures in Berlin
Sculptures of men in Germany
Statues in Berlin
Marble sculptures in Germany